Only the Brave may refer to:

 Only the Brave (1930 film), an American Civil War drama
 Only the Brave (1994 film), an Australian film
 Only the Brave (2006 film), an American independent film set during World War II
 Only the Brave (2017 film), an American film about wildfire firefighters
 "Only the Brave" (song)
 OTB Group, parent company of a number of fashion brands

See also
 Lonely the Brave, an English rock band